A drum magazine is a type of high-capacity magazine for firearms. Cylindrical in shape (similar to a drum), drum magazines store rounds in a spiral around the center of the magazine, facing the direction of the barrel. Drum magazines are contrasted with more common box-type magazines, which have a lower capacity and store rounds flat. The capacity of drum magazines varies, but is generally between 50 and 100 rounds.

History and usage

1800s
The first revolving drum magazine was patented in 1853 by Charles N. Tyler, and the first modern-type one by William H. Elliot, better known as the inventor of the Remington Double Derringer, in 1871.

1900s

Pistols and rifles

A drum magazine was built for the Luger (Pistole 1908) pistol; although the Luger usually used an 8-cartridge box magazine, the optional 32-cartridge Schneckenmagazine ("snail magazine") was also sometimes used.

Moubray G. Farquhar and Arthur H. Hill applied for a British patent for "A New or Improved Cartridge Magazine for Small Arms and Machine Guns" in 1915 for their Farquhar–Hill rifle, and it was accepted in 1919.

Submachine guns 

In 1915, the Standschütze Hellriegel M1915 (German: Maschinengewehr des Standschützen Hellriegel, "Machine gun from reservist Hellriegel"), an Austro-Hungarian water-cooled submachine gun, was produced during World War I in very limited prototype numbers.

The Soviet PPD submachine gun originally designed in 1934 by Vasily Degtyaryov could use either a 35-round box magazine, or a 71-round drum magazine copied from the Finnish Suomi KP/-31 submachine gun that however used 9x19mm Parabellum instead, and the latter magazine was most common. The Soviet PPSh-41 submachine gun and PPS-43 which replaced the PPD were cheaper and more reliable weapons designed in 1941 and 1943, respectively. They too used 7.62×25mm Tokarev ammunition, could use either a 35-round box magazine or a 71-round drum magazine, and the latter was most common.

The Thompson submachine gun ("Tommy gun") used a drum magazine in its classic form, but the drum magazines for this weapon were abandoned on the World War II models. The M1921 Thompsons could accommodate either 20-round box magazines or 50-round cylindrical drum magazines; the latter were known as "L drums" because "L" is the Latin numeral for 50. A 100-round "C drum" magazine (the letter standing for the Roman numeral for 100) was available, but weighed more than eight pounds and pushed the total weight of the gun to almost . The M1928 Navy and M1928A1 variants, used by the US Navy and US Marine Corps, could also accept drum magazines, but standard box magazines were more popular due to the drum magazines' weight and tendency to jam.

Machine guns 

An example of a machine gun with an optional belt drum magazine, containing a starter tab and 50-round length coil of ammunition belt, is the  MG 42 (shortened from German: Maschinengewehr 42, or "machine gun 42"), a 7.92×57mm Mauser general-purpose machine gun designed in Nazi Germany and used extensively by the Wehrmacht and the Waffen-SS during the second half of World War II. The 50-round Gurttrommel (belt drum) was also used by the preceding MG 34 general purpose machine gun. Designed to be low-cost and easy to build, the MG 42 proved to be highly reliable and easy to operate. It is most notable for its very high cyclic rate for a gun using full power service cartridges, averaging about 1,200 rounds per minute compared to around 850 for the MG 34, and perhaps 450 to 600 for other common machine guns like the M1919 Browning or Bren.

Pan magazines 

Pan magazines (also called "disc magazines") are also often referred to as a drum magazine. The pan magazine differs from other drum magazines in that the cartridges are stored perpendicular to the axis of rotation, rather than parallel, and are usually mounted on top of the firearm. This type is used on the Lewis gun, Vickers K, Bren gun (only used in anti-aircraft mountings), Degtyaryov light machine gun, and American-180 submachine gun. A highly unusual example was found on the Type 89 machine gun fed from two 45-round quadrant-shaped pan magazines (each magazine had a place for nine 5-round stripper clips).

2000s

In the 2010s, drum magazines are manufactured for a variety of firearm platforms, including, among others, the Ruger Mini-14 in .223 caliber; the Kalashnikov rifle (AK) and its variants; firearms using STANAG magazines, and the H&K MP-5.

Drum magazines once had a reputation for unreliability issues such as feed jams, but technological improvements resulted in better performance, while also reducing their cost. As a result, drum magazines became more common in the civilian market in the United States, although they are far less common than standard, lower-capacity box magazines. As of 2019, about six manufacturers produced drum magazines in the United States, retailing for about $100 each. Manufacturers include KCI USA and Magpul Industries; the latter produces the same drum magazines for both civilian and military use.

Regulation in the United States

Drum magazines have been used in a number of high-profile mass shootings in the United States, fueling calls to ban drum magazines and other high-capacity magazines from civilian use. Drum magazines were used in the shooting massacres in Aurora, Colorado, in 2012; Las Vegas, Nevada in 2017 (the deadliest mass shooting in the history of the United States); and Dayton, Ohio, in 2019, allowing gunmen to fire dozens of rounds in very short periods of time, without the need to stop to reload. Experts have identified restrictions on high-capacity magazines as a factor that could make mass shooting attacks less deadly.

Between 1994 and 2004, the Federal Assault Weapons Ban prohibited new magazines over 10 rounds in the United States. After the expiration of the ban, there is no nationwide prohibition against the possession of drum magazines, which are considered a regulated firearm accessory. However, as of 2019, ten states set a maximum limit on the capacity of magazines, including California, New York, Colorado,and the District of Columbia.

Notes

References
 
 

Magazines (firearms)

de:Magazin (Waffentechnik)#Trommelmagazin